Ragib Ali (born 10 October 1936) is a Bangladeshi-born British industrialist, pioneer tea-planter and educationalist. He is also associated with bank, insurance companies, and many other businesses. He is the founder of Leading University, Sylhet. In 2017, he was sentenced to 14 years in prison for corruption by the lower court, but later on he was granted bail by the Supreme Court, Dhaka

Early life 
Ali was born in Talibpur, Kamal Bazaar, Bishwanath, Sylhet District, Bengal Presidency. He has eight brothers.

Ali was educated in what is now Bangladesh. He studied at the Raza G.C High School and College of Sylhet. In 1956, at the age of 20, he moved to the United Kingdom to further his education.

Career 
In 1961, after completing his education Ali started being involved in business. Once in the UK, he transformed himself from an ordinary waiter to a leading entrepreneur. He still has links with UK through his family members, who live in London as well as in Bradford, where majority of his father's family now live in.

Ali is the chairman of Sylhet Tea Company Ltd. and several other tea estates in Sylhet and Chittagong. He is also the managing director of Kohinoor Industries Ltd. He is the chairman of Southeast Bank Limited. He has played a pioneering role in the tea industry. He is involved in charitable activities and has set up numerous trusts and educational institutions.
 
Ali is the founder chairman of Jalalabad Ragib-Rabeya Medical College. He is also the immediate past chairman of North South University Foundation. He is also the founder of Leading University and University of Asia Pacific. He also contributed in many schools and established many colleges around Bangladesh.

Controversy 
The Bangladeshi Anti-Corruption Commission (ACC) filed a case against him for amassing illegal wealth and concealing information about his assets. He was also accused of illegal occupation of property of the minority Hindu community which he was subsequently forced to give back. He along with his family fled to India to avoid arrest. However, they were sent back to Bangladesh after being arrested in Assam after their visa expired. He along with his son, Syed Abdul Hye, was convicted in court and Ragib was sentenced to 14 years in Jail on 6 April 2017. He had grabbed the land (tea estate) in 1990 after forcing the Shebayet (caretaker) Pankaj Kumar Gupta to flee to India. His daughter, son-in-law, and another relative were also convicted by the court. However, he got bail on these cases on 29 October 2018,eleven months after the conviction from the Supreme Court.

References 

1938 births
Living people
Bangladeshi emigrants to the United Kingdom
Bangladeshi businesspeople
British businesspeople
Plantation owners
People from Bishwanath Upazila
Bangladeshi male criminals